Blake Mawson (born April 24, 1984) is a Canadian actor, filmmaker, and screenwriter. After beginning his career as an actor in the 2000s, Mawson later attracted acclaim as director of the short film Pyotr495 (2016), for which he won several accolades.

Early life and education 
Born and raised in Vancouver, British Columbia, Mawson is a graduate of the Directors' Lab program at the Canadian Film Centre.

Career 
Mawson began his career in the early 2000s as an actor and later attracted acclaim for his filmmaking work, most notably as director of the short film Pyotr495, for which he won the Emerging Artist Award at the 2016 Inside Out Film and Video Festival and received a Canadian Screen Award nomination at the 7th Canadian Screen Awards for Best Direction in a Web Program or Series.

As an actor, he had a starring role in Gore, Quebec, as well as small parts in the films X2, Freddy vs. Jason, Poison Ivy: The Secret Society and Nurse 3D, and the television series Sk8, Cold Squad, The Evidence, Blade, and The Strain.

His feature film debut, tentatively titled The Viridian, is in development and was selected for Inside Out's 2020 Finance Forum.

Personal life 
Mawson is out as a member of the LGBTQ+ community.

References

External links

1984 births
20th-century Canadian male actors
21st-century Canadian male actors
21st-century Canadian screenwriters
Canadian male film actors
Canadian male television actors
Canadian male child actors
Canadian male screenwriters
Canadian Film Centre alumni
Canadian LGBT actors
Canadian LGBT screenwriters
LGBT male actors
LGBT film directors
Male actors from Vancouver
Film directors from Vancouver
Writers from Vancouver
Living people
21st-century Canadian LGBT people